Bromme was a racing car constructor who competed in the FIA World Championship (Indy 500 only) from 1951 to 1954.

World Championship Indy 500 results

Formula One constructors (Indianapolis only)
American racecar constructors